John Coleman VC (1821 – 22 May 1858) was an English recipient of the Victoria Cross, the highest and most prestigious award for gallantry in the face of the enemy that can be awarded to British and Commonwealth forces. He was a native of Norwich.

Details

He was 34 years old, and a Corporal in the 97th (The Earl of Ulster's) Regiment of Foot (later The Queen's Own Royal West Kent Regiment), British Army during the Crimean War when the following deed took place for which he was awarded the VC. He had been promoted to Sergeant by the time of the award.

On 30 August 1855 at Sebastopol, the Crimean Peninsula, when the enemy attacked "New Sap" and drove the working party in, Sergeant Coleman remained in the open, exposed to the enemy's rifle pits until all around him had been killed or wounded. He finally carried one of his officers who was mortally wounded, to the rear.

He died of fever at Lucknow, India, on 22 May 1858.

His Victoria Cross is displayed at The Queen's Own Royal West Kent Regiment Museum in Maidstone, Kent, England.

Death announcements

Norfolk News 24 July 1858:

Norfolk Chronicle and Norwich Gazette 24 July 1858 :

External links

References

1821 births
1858 deaths
British recipients of the Victoria Cross
Crimean War recipients of the Victoria Cross
Queen's Own Royal West Kent Regiment soldiers
British Army personnel of the Crimean War
British military personnel of the Indian Rebellion of 1857
Military personnel from Norwich
British military personnel killed in the Indian Rebellion of 1857
British Army recipients of the Victoria Cross